Girl detective is a genre of detective fiction featuring a young, often teen-aged, female protagonist who solves crimes as a hobby.

History
A professional female detective appeared in the popular stories Miss Madelyn Mack, Detective, written by Hugh Cosgro Weir in 1909. But the earliest published version of a girl sought out as an amateur detective appears in the story collection The Golden Slipper and Other Problems for Violet Strange, by Anna Katharine Green, published in 1915. The latter featured a debutante who secretly solves crimes while taking part in New York high society.

Several novels for young readers by L. Frank Baum also had young female characters involved in crime solving, especially in cases involving protecting their family. Phoebe Daring was a 16-year old who took on the task of proving her twin brother’s innocence in The Daring Twins: A Story for Young Folk, published in 1911. Baum's character of Mary Louise Burrows was a fifteen-year-old girl who works to reveal her grandfather's innocence in his book series begun in 1916 under the pseudonym Edith Van Dyne.

The term “girl detective” was a popular enough as a concept to appear in several book titles, for example New York Nell, the Boy-Girl Detective (1854) by Edward Wheeler, which featured a teenage girl who dresses as a boy to sell newspaper and solve crimes. Nick Carter’s Girl Detective a dime novel series about Roxy, a student in Nick's detective school, and Bobs: A Girl Detective’’ by Carol Norton (1928).

One of the best known and longest-running girl detective series was the Nancy Drew mystery series, started in 1930 and running under a number of subseries titles, including ‘’Nancy Drew: Girl Detective’’ (2004-2012) and the ‘’Nancy Drew Diaries’’ (started in 2013). She is often cited as the most influential of the girl sleuth characters. The original series was published by the Stratemeyer publishing company. The books appeared under the author name of Carolyn Keene, a pseudonym used by a number of authors for the series over the years.Melanie Rehak (2005) Girl Sleuth: Nancy Drew and the Women Who Created Her. New York: Harcourt, Inc.

The popularity of the Nancy Drew series spawned many mid-20th-century detecting heroines such as Judy Bolton (1932 – 1967), created by Margaret Sutton; Kay Tracey (1934 to 1942); and Trixie Belden (1948 to 1986). (See the page List of fictional detective for younger readers for a fuller listing.)

The era of some of the earlier heroines was echoed in later historical fiction, as seen in detective series such as the Mary Russell novels, and the Maisie Dobbs series, both set in and just after World War I.

A subgenre with middle-school heroines also developed, starting with Louise Fitzhugh’s novel Harriet the Spy written in 1964,Virginia L. Wolf, Harriet the Spy: Milestone, Masterpiece?  Children's Literature Vol 4, 120-126 1975 and including the Flavia de Luce series by Alan Bradley, begun in 2009 with the book The Sweetness at the Bottom of the Pie, and The Great Shelby Holmes by Elizabeth Eulberg, and Friday Barnes, Girl Detective by R.A. Spratt, both from 2016.

Film and television

In films of the early 20th century, this character type was already seen, as in The Girl Detective (1915), a series of 2-reel thrillers directed by James W. Horner which featured a society girl who served as a special investigator for the police. Ruth Roland starred as the girl detective who worked on cases where her unique talents could help to solve crimes. Each short film was a complete story episode.

Multiple versions of Nancy Drew were filmed. In the '30s there were a number of Nancy drew films: Nancy Drew: Detective (1938); Nancy Drew... Reporter (1939); Nancy Drew... Trouble Shooter (1939); Nancy Drew and the Hidden Staircase (1939). On TV there were alternating episodes of The Hardy Boys/Nancy Drew Mysteries'' from 1977–1979, starring Pamela Sue Martin as Nancy. A Disney movie was made in 2002, starring Maggie Lawson as a college student Nancy.

References

Crime fiction
Detective fiction
Fictional amateur detectives
Juvenile series
Literary genres
Women in fiction